Elevate–Webiplex Pro Cycling is a professional men's cycling team based in the United States. The team started competing in 2011 as an amateur team, starting competition in elite road bicycle racing events under UCI Continental rules in 2016.

Team roster

Major results
2018
 Stage 4 Joe Martin Stage Race, José Alfredo Rodríguez
 Winston-Salem Cycling Classic, Sam Bassetti
 Overall Tour de Beauce, James Piccoli
Stage 4, James Piccoli

2019
Stage 4 Tour de Taiwan, James Piccoli
Overall Tour of the Gila, James Piccoli
Stage 1, James Piccoli
Stage 4, Eric Young
Winston Salem Cycling Classic, Ulises Alfredo Castillo
Stage 2 Tour de Beauce, James Piccoli
White Spot / Delta Road Race, Sam Bassetti
Prologue Tour of Utah, James Piccoli

2020
Stages 1, 4 & 5 Tour de Taiwan, Eric Young
Points classification, Eric Young

References

External links

 Road-results.com

Cycling teams based in the United States
Cycling teams established in 2011